Platystomos wallacei is a species of beetle belonging to the family Anthribidae, the fungus weevils.

Description
These fungus weevils have thread-like antennae, that in males are longer than the body.

Distribution
This species can be found in Philippines, Indonesia, New Guinea, Aru Islands and Australia.

References 

wallacei
Beetles described in 1953